In enzymology, a citrate CoA-transferase is an enzyme that catalyzes the following chemical reaction:

acetyl-CoA + citrate  acetate + (3S)-citryl-CoA

Thus, the two substrates of this enzyme are acetyl-CoA and citrate, whereas its two products are acetate and (3S)-citryl-CoA.

This enzyme belongs to the family of transferases, specifically the CoA-transferases.  The systematic name of this enzyme class is acetyl-CoA:citrate CoA-transferase. This enzyme participates in citrate cycle (tca cycle).

References

 

EC 2.8.3
Enzymes of unknown structure